Closer than Close may refer to:

 Closer than Close (album), a 1995 album by Rosie Gaines
 "Closer than Close" (Rosie Gaines song), 1997
 "Closer than Close" (Jean Carne song), 1986